Warwick Angus (born 14 July 1969) is a former Australian rules footballer who represented the  North Melbourne Football Club in the Victorian Football League/Australian Football League (VFL/AFL) between 1989 and 1991.

Angus spent 3 years at North in which he played in 13 games, kicking 3 goals, before leaving the game in 1991. He was the last man to wear jumper number 11 at North before Shinboner of the Century Glenn Archer debuted the next year.

References

1969 births
Living people
North Melbourne Football Club players
Australian rules footballers from Victoria (Australia)